Spencer Roloson Winery is a winery in St. Helena, California, United States It produces wines from the volcanic California hillsides of the St. Helena and Clear Lake areas. It was founded in 1998 by winemaker Samuel Spencer and businesswoman Wendy Roloson with the goal of creating a premium winery. Focusing on Rhone and Spanish varietals, they specialize in single vineyard estate bottlings of Syrah, Viognier and Tempranillo.

The Spencer Roloson portfolio of wines includes the varietals Tempranillo, Grenache blanc, Grenache noir, Viognier and Syrah, which hail from the winegrowing regions of Northern Spain through the Rhone Valley in France. Spencer Roloson Winery also produces a Southern Rhone style blend called Palaterra as well as Zinfandel.

Spencer Roloson produces wines with grapes harvested from four vineyards. The steep and rocky Madder Lake Vineyard is located directly north of Mount St. Helena in Clear Lake appellation of Lake County. The La Herradura Vineyard is east of St. Helena at the base of Howell Mountain. Viognier is grown at the Noble Vineyard is at the foot of the Mayacamas Mountains, and Grenache blanc at the Esperanza Vineyard in Clarksburg near Sacramento.

The winery is an early client of Enologix, a computer software-driven laboratory analysis service run by a friend of Spencer's that helps winemakers match taste profiles to wines rated highly by Robert Parker and Wine Spectator.

References

External links
 
 
 
 *

Wineries in California
Wineries in Napa Valley
Companies based in Napa County, California
St. Helena, California
1998 establishments in California